The 2013–14 Stephen F. Austin Lumberjacks basketball team represented Stephen F. Austin University during the 2013–14 NCAA Division I men's basketball season. The Lumberjacks were led by new head coach Brad Underwood and played their home games at the William R. Johnson Coliseum. They were members of the Southland Conference. They finished the season 32–3, 18–0 in Southland play to claim their second consecutive Southland regular season championship. They were champions of the Southland Conference tournament to earn an automatic bid to the NCAA tournament. In the NCAA Tournament, they upset VCU in the second round before losing in the third round to UCLA.

The team has been regarded in the national media as the biggest "cinderella" team in the NCAA March Madness tournament.

Roster

Schedule

|-
!colspan=9 style="background:#5F259F; color:#FFFFFF;"| Exhibition

|-
!colspan=9 style="background:#5F259F; color:#FFFFFF;"| Regular season

|-
!colspan=9 style="background:#5F259F; color:#FFFFFF;"| Southland tournament

|-
!colspan=9 style="background:#5F259F; color:#FFFFFF;"| NCAA tournament

References

Stephen F. Austin Lumberjacks basketball seasons
Stephen F. Austin
Stephen F. Austin
Stephen F. Austin Lumberjacks basketball
Stephen F. Austin Lumberjacks basketball